Marisa Robles (born May 4, 1937) is a Spanish harpist and composer.

She was born in Spain, where she studied the harp with Luisa Menarguez, and studied music at the Madrid Conservatory, graduating at the age of sixteen in 1953. She made her concert debut at seventeen, performing with flautist Jean-Pierre Rampal.

The Concerto for Flute and Harp by Mozart which they performed together was to become the piece for which she is best known.  She has recorded and performed it with James Galway and with her husband Christopher Hyde-Smith, among others.  In 1963 she premiered Sones en la Giralda on the BBC, a wedding present written for her by Joaquín Rodrigo. In 1981, she wrote the music for a set of audiobooks of the Chronicles of Narnia, narrated by Sir Michael Hordern. This was released as her Narnia Suite in 1981, with Robles playing harp and her husband the flute.

In 1958 she married, and in 1960 she came to live permanently in the UK. In 1971 she became a professor of harp in the Royal College of Music.She now has three children, St. John Harvey, Grania Hyde-Smith and Alexander Hyde-Smith. 

Robles was artistic director for the first two Cardiff World Harp Festivals in 1991 and 1994.

References

1937 births
Living people
Spanish classical harpists
Academics of the Royal College of Music
Madrid Royal Conservatory alumni